Sudzha (Hujaa) is a rural locality (a settlement) in Kyakhtinsky District, Republic of Buryatia, Russia. The population was 16 as of 2010.

Geography 
Sudzha is located 66 km east of Kyakhta (the district's administrative centre) by road. Murochi is the nearest rural locality.

References 

Rural localities in Kyakhtinsky District